Laura Sheeran (born 19 April 1987) is an Irish singer, musician, composer and artist. She is the cousin of Ed Sheeran.

Along with Marc Aubele, she also performs as 'Glitterface', the frontperson and singer for Nanu Nanu, who describe themselves as "an alien synth-pop" act. Aside from her own solo career, she has performed with Fovea Hex, having been recruited for the group by Clodagh Simonds and is now also a member of RESOUND, a Dublin-based musical collective put together by Kate Ellis in 2011.

Sheeran sings and performs on a loop station, bowed saw, melodica, accordion, flute, ukulele, and used a TC Helicon Voice Live 2 to manipulate her vocals and create harmonies. She frequently incorporates improvisation into her performances.

Musicians with whom she performs include Cora Venus Lunny, Kate Ellis, Catríona Cannon, Linda Buckley and Marc Aubele.

Solo Discography

 Music for the Deep Woods, EP, 2010.
 To The Depths, EP, 2010
 Live Studio Recordings – November 2010 2010
 Lust of Pig & The Fresh Blood, double album 2011.
 Murderous Love, nine track EP, 2011
 Paper Dolls OST original soundtrack, 2011
 What The World Knows, single album 2012.

Fovea Hex: Neither Speak Nor Remain Silent trilogy

 Bloom EP – Janet Records, Dublin and Die Stadt Records, Bremen, 1 November 2005,
 Huge EP – 10 May 2006.
 Allure EP – 1 June 2007.
 This Is Where We Used To Sing – album, Janet Records, 2012

Theater Music

Rural Electric (2004) – Written and Directed by John Nee. Original Music Composed and Performed by Laura Sheeran
The Mental (2006) – Written by John Nee, Directed by John Nee & Ray Yeats. Original Music Composed and Performed by Laura Sheeran & Nuala Ní Channain
Limavady, My Heart's Delight (2006) – Written and Directed by John Nee. Original Music Composed and Performed by Laura Sheeran . Role of 'Phillis' also acted by Laura Sheeran
An T-Amhráin Briste(2007) – Written and Directed by John Nee. Original Music Composed by Laura Sheeran and John Nee, performed by John Nee, Laura Sheeran, Chaoimhe Connolly

Film Music

Short Films
The Tragic Tale of Arthur King The Last (2005) – Directed by Barry Richardson. Original Music by Laura Sheeran
Mr. Skin (2006) – Written and Directed by Barry Richardson. Original Music by Laura Sheeran
Bad Habit (2007) – Written and Directed by Heather Mills. Original Music by Laura Sheeran
Echo (2012) – Written and Directed by Ela Gas. Original Music by Laura Sheeran
Documentaries
Natural Traditions (2010) – Produced by Bridget Sheeran in collaboration with the Community Midwives Association. Original Music by Laura Sheeran

External links
 
 http://laurasheeran.bandcamp.com/
 https://soundcloud.com/laurasheeran/sets
 http://breakingtunes.com/laurasheeran
 http://nanunanu.eu/
 http://harmlessnoise.wordpress.com/2011/04/18/competition-laura-sheeran/
 https://www.myspace.com/foveahex

1987 births
Irish songwriters
Living people
Musicians from County Galway
21st-century Irish singers
21st-century Irish women singers